Lin Hujia (5 December 1916 – 13 September 2018) was a Chinese politician. He was born in Changdao County, Shandong Province. He was mayor and communist party chief of Beijing and Tianjin. He was Minister of Agriculture (1981–1982). Lin died in 2018 at the age of 101.

References

1916 births
2018 deaths
People's Republic of China politicians from Shandong
Chinese Communist Party politicians from Shandong
Mayors of Beijing
Mayors of Tianjin
Ministers of Agriculture of the People's Republic of China
Eighth Route Army personnel
Deputy Communist Party secretaries of Zhejiang
Chinese centenarians
Men centenarians